Royal marriages to commoners have historically been uncommon, due to traditions of members of royal families, especially high-level ones, only marrying other persons considered to be royalty, sometimes with penalties for royals who married far below their rank, deemed morganatic marriage. Often, alliances could be created between countries or strengthened within a country through intermarriage of two royal families. On the other hand, occasionally a member of a royal family married a commoner simply due to romantic feelings or physical attraction, and possibly to endear themselves to the general population by establishing that sense of connection. This trend has accelerated and become more accepted in modern times.

Before Common Era
 Pharaoh Amenhotep III and Tiye (14th century BC)
 Esther and Ahasuerus, 5th century BC

Early modern
 1356: King Casimir III the Great of Poland and Krystyna Rokiczana, widow of a merchant, as his third wife.
 January 1557: Ferdinand II, Archduke of Austria and Philippine Welser, daughter of a merchant.  He married dynastically after her death
 4 July 1568: King Eric XIV of Sweden and Karin Månsdotter, daughter of a prison guard.  He was deposed within a year
 1707: Tsar Peter the Great of Russia and Marta Skowrońska, who was born a peasant but ended up succeeding her husband as Catherine I of Russia.  They are the ancestors of the Russian Imperial Family

19th century
 3 September 1823: Archduke John of Austria and Anna Plochl, daughter of a postmaster.  Their romance was immortalized in the 1929 Austrian film Archduke John 
 28 December 1833 Maria Christina of the Two Sicilies, Queen Dowager of Spain, and her bodyguard Agustín Fernando Muñoz. On 23 June 1844 he was created Duke of Riánsares by her daughter Queen Isabella II of Spain 
 5 April 1836: Charles Ferdinand of the Two Sicilies, Prince of Capua and Penelope Smyth, at Gretna Green
 8 January 1847: Prince George, Duke of Cambridge and actress Sarah Fairbrother, in contravention of the Royal Marriages Act 1772
 4 June 1848: Infanta Josefina Fernanda of Spain and writer José Güell y Renté
 20 April 1850: Prince Adalbert of Prussia and dancer Therese Elssler
 7 August 1850: King Frederick VII of Denmark and dancer/actress Louise Rasmussen as his third wife
 28 May 1859: Duke Ludwig Wilhelm in Bavaria and actress Henriette Mendel
 21 August 1860: Duke Ernest of Württemberg and actress/singer Natalie Eischborn
 4 February 1868: Archduke Heinrich Anton of Austria and singer Leopoldine Hofmann
 14 November 1868: Prince August of Württemberg and Marie Bethge
 18 October 1869: King Victor Emmanuel II of Italy and Rosa Vercellana, daughter of an Officer in the King's Guards
 1882: Grand Duke Nicholas Konstantinovich of Russia and Nadezhda Alexandrovna von Dreyer, daughter of the Orenburg police chief

20th century
 27 January 1903: Archduke Leopold Ferdinand of Austria and prostitute Wilhelmine Adamovicz
 25 September 1907: Archduchess Louise of Austria, former Crown Princess of Saxony, and musician Enrico Toselli
 15 August 1909: Archduke Ferdinand Karl of Austria and Bertha Czuber, daughter of a mathematician
 15 September 1909: Prince Miguel, Duke of Viseu (Portugal) and American heiress Anita Stewart
 9 January 1913: Archduchess Eleonora of Austria and sailor Alfons von Kloss
 16 November 1916: Grand Duchess Olga Alexandrovna of Russia and Nikolai Kulikovsky
 26 September 1917 Prince Alfonso of Portugal and American heiress Nevada Stoody Hayes
 1 February 1920: Prince Christopher of Greece and Denmark and American heiress Nancy Stewart Worthington Leeds
 23 November 1922: Princess Dagmar of Denmark and Jørgen Castenskjold, son of the Court Chamberlain
 11 February 1924: Prince Erik of Denmark and Canadian Lois Booth
 10 June 1924: Prince Viggo of Denmark and American Eleanor Margaret Green
 7 November 1931: Prince Nicholas of Romania and Ioana Dumitrescu-Doletti
 8 March 1934: Prince Sigvard of Sweden and Erica Maria Patzek
 3 June 1937: Prince Edward, Duke of Windsor (formerly King Edward VIII) and Wallis Simpson
 19 February 1946: Prince Carl Johan of Sweden and journalist Kerstin Wijkmark
 24 July 1946: Louis II, Prince of Monaco and actress Ghislaine Dommanget
 21 April 1947: Princess Katherine of Greece and Denmark and British Army major Richard Brandram
 4 February 1948: Prince Oluf of Denmark and Annie Helene Dorrit Puggard-Müller
 24 May 1949: Prince Flemming of Denmark and Alice Ruth Nielsen
 27 May 1949 Prince Aly Khan and actress Rita Hayworth
 4 December 1951: Princess Antoinette of Monaco and tennis champion Alexandre-Athenase Noghès
 10 October 1952: Atsuko, Princess Yori of Japan and Takamasa Ikeda
 15 May 1953: Princess Ragnhild of Norway and shipowner Erling Lorentzen
 18 April 1956: Rainier III, Prince of Monaco and actress Grace Kelly
 10 April 1959: Akihito, Crown Prince of Japan and Michiko Shōda
 20 December 1959: Mohammad Reza Pahlavi, Shah of Iran and Farah Diba
 3 March 1960: Takako, Princess Suga of Japan and Hisanaga Shimazu
 6 May 1960: Princess Margaret of the United Kingdom and photographer Antony Armstrong-Jones
 12 January 1961: Princess Astrid of Norway and Johan Ferner
 25 May 1961: King Hussein of Jordan and Toni Gardiner
 2 December 1961 Princess Antoinette of Monaco and Dr. Jean-Charles Rey
 20 March 1963: Palden Thondup Namgyal, Chogyal (King) of Sikkim and Hope Cooke
 30 June 1964: Princess Margaretha of Sweden and John Ambler
 7 February 1965: Prince Michael of Greece and Denmark and artist Marina Karella
 16 December 1966: Princess Yasuko of Mikasa (Japan) and Tadateru Konoe
 10 January 1967: Princess Margriet of the Netherlands and Pieter van Vollenhoven
 1 March 1967 Prince Charles of Luxembourg and American Joan Dillon
 13 January 1968: Prince Ingolf of Denmark and Inge Terney
 29 August 1968: Harald, Crown Prince of Norway and Sonja Haraldsen
 9 February 1971: Prince Christian of Denmark and Anne Dorte Maltoft-Nielsen
 11 September 1971: Prince Philipp of Liechtenstein and Isabelle de l'Arbre de Malander
 8 July 1972: Prince Richard of Gloucester and Birgitte van Deurs
 12 October 1972: Infanta Margarita, Duchess of Soria and physician Carlos Zurita y Delgado
 24 December 1972: King Hussein of Jordan and Alia Toukan
 14 November 1973: Princess Anne of the United Kingdom and Mark Phillips
 15 June 1974: Princess Christina of Sweden and Tord Magnuson
 28 June 1975: Princess Christina of the Netherlands and Jorge Guillermo
 25 December 1975: Sultan Abdul Halim of Kedah and Haminah binti Hamidun
 19 June 1976: King Carl XVI Gustaf of Sweden and Silvia Sommerlath
 7 December 1976: Prince Bertil, Duke of Halland and model Lilian Davies
 15 June 1978: King Hussein of Jordan and Lisa Halaby
 29 June 1978: Princess Caroline of Monaco and property developer Philippe Junot
 7 November 1980: Prince Tomohito of Mikasa (Japan) and Nobuko Asō
 28 July 1983: Princess Antoinette of Monaco and John Gilpin (dancer)
 14 October 1983: Princess Masako of Mikasa (Japan) and Masayuki Sen
 29 December 1983: Princess Caroline of Monaco and Stefano Casiraghi
 1 December 1984: Prince Norihito of Mikasa (Japan) and Hisako Tottori
 23 July 1986: Prince Andrew of the United Kingdom and Sarah Ferguson
 27 May 1987 Prince Jean of Luxembourg and Hélène Suzanna Vestur
 29 June 1990: Fumihito, Prince Aya of Japan and Kiko Kawashima
 12 December 1992: Anne, Princess Royal and Royal Navy officer Timothy Laurence
 9 June 1993: Naruhito, Crown Prince of Japan and Masako Owada
 10 June 1993: Prince Abdullah of Jordan and Rania Al-Yassin
 18 September 1993: Princess Charlotte of Luxembourg and Marc Victor Cunningham
 29 January 1994: Prince Robert of Luxembourg and Julie Elizabeth Houston Ongaro
 February 1994: Crown Prince Vajiralongkorn of Thailand and Sujarinee Vivacharawongse
 8 September 1994: Prince Guillaume of Luxembourg and Sibilla Weiller
 1 July 1995: Pavlos, Crown Prince of Greece and Marie-Chantal Miller
 1 July 1995: Princess Stéphanie of Monaco and bodyguard Daniel Ducruet
 18 November 1995: Prince Joachim of Denmark and Alexandra Manley
 4 October 1997: Infanta Cristina of Spain and Iñaki Urdangarin
 19 June 1999: Prince Edward of the United Kingdom and Sophie Rhys-Jones
 9 July 1999: Princess Alexia of Greece and Denmark and Carlos Morales

21st century
 29 January 2000 Prince Maximilian of Liechtenstein and Angela Brown
 18 February 2000 King Letsie III of Lesotho and 'Masenate Mohato Seeiso
 10 February 2001: Crown Prince Vajiralongkorn of Thailand and Srirasmi Suwadee
 19 May 2001: Prince Constantijn of the Netherlands and Petra Laurentien Brinkhorst
 25 August 2001: Haakon, Crown Prince of Norway and Mette-Marit Tjessem Hoiby
 12 October 2001: King Mohammed VI of Morocco and Salma Bennani
 2 February 2002: Willem-Alexander of the Netherlands and Máxima Zorreguieta Cerruti
 24 May 2002: Princess Märtha Louise of Norway and Ari Behn
 8 February 2003: Prince Alexander of Liechtenstein and Astrid Kohl
 12 April 2003 : Prince Laurent of Belgium and land surveyor Claire Louise Coombs
 12 September 2003: Princess Stéphanie of Monaco and acrobat Adans Lopez Peres
 24 April 2004: Prince Friso of Orange-Nassau (Netherlands) and Mabel Wisse Smit
 14 May 2004:  Frederik, Crown Prince of Denmark and Mary Donaldson
 22 May 2004:  Felipe, Prince of Asturias (Spain) and journalist Letizia Ortiz
 9 April 2005: Charles, Prince of Wales (United Kingdom) and Camilla Parker Bowles
 15 November 2005: Sayako, Princess Nori of Japan and Yoshiki Kuroda
 29 September 2006: Prince Louis of Luxembourg and Tessy Antony
 24 May 2008: Prince Joachim of Denmark and Marie Cavallier
 19 June 2010: Victoria, Crown Princess of Sweden and her personal trainer Daniel Westling
 25 August 2010: Prince Nikolaos of Greece and Denmark and Tatiana Blatnik
 29 April 2011: Prince William of Wales (United Kingdom) and Catherine Middleton
 2 July 2011: Albert II, Prince of Monaco and Olympic swimmer Charlene Wittstock 
 13 October 2011: Jigme Khesar Namgyel Wangchuck, King of Bhutan and Jetsun Pema
 8 June 2013: Princess Madeleine, Duchess of Hälsingland and Gästrikland (Sweden) and British-American financier Christopher O'Neill
 31 August 2013: Prince Rahim Aga Khan and American model Kendra Irene Spears
 17 September 2013: Prince Felix of Luxembourg and Claire Lademacher
 27 May 2014: Princess Noriko of Takamado (Japan) and Kunimaro Senge
 13 June 2015: Prince Carl Philip, Duke of Värmland (Sweden) and model Sofia Hellqvist
 19 May 2018: Prince Harry of Wales (United Kingdom) and actress Meghan Markle
 12 October 2018: Princess Eugenie of York (United Kingdom) and bar manager Jack Brooksbank
 29 October 2018: Princess Ayako of Takamado (Japan) and Kei Moriya
 November 2018: Princess Mako of Akishino (Japan) and 	Kei Komuro
 1 May 2019: King Vajiralongkorn of Thailand and Suthida Tidjai
 16 July 2020: Princess Beatrice of York (United Kingdom) and property developer Edoardo Mapelli Mozzi
 20 July 2020: Eleonore von Habsburg and Jérôme d'Ambrosio
 12 December 2020: Prince Philippos of Greece and Denmark and Nina Flohr
 26 October 2021: Princess Mako of Akishino (Japan) and Kei Komuro

References

Marriages to commoners